Somewhere Beyond Love is a 1974 Italian drama film directed by Luigi Comencini. It was entered into the 1974 Cannes Film Festival. It won the Grand Prix of the Belgian Film Critics Association.

Cast
 Giuliano Gemma - Nullo Bronzi
 Stefania Sandrelli - Carmela Santoro
 Brizio Montinaro - Pasquale Santoro
 Renato Scarpa - the doctor
 Cesira Abbiati - Adalgisa
 Rina Franchetti
 Emilio Bonucci
 Antonio Iodice
 Pippo Starnazza
 Walter Valdi - (as Walter Pinetti Valdi)
 Bruno Cattaneo
 Torquato Tessarini
 Marisa Rosales
 Luigi Antonio Guerra
 Carla Mancini

References

External links

1974 films
1970s Italian-language films
1974 drama films
Films directed by Luigi Comencini
Films scored by Carlo Rustichelli
Films set in Milan
Films with screenplays by Ugo Pirro
Italian drama films
1970s Italian films